Lake St Clair or leeawulenna is a natural freshwater lake located in the Central Highlands area of Tasmania, Australia. The lake forms the southern end of the Cradle Mountain-Lake St Clair National Park.

The lake is fed by Narcissus River, Cuvier River, and Hamilton Creek and marks the start of the River Derwent.

The locality of Lake St Clair is in the local government areas of Central Highlands (24%), Meander Valley (12%), and West Coast (64%).

Geology
Lake St Clair was formed through glacial erosion, along with the surrounding river valleys.

History
Lake St Clair is located on the edge of the Big River Tasmanian Aboriginal nation, and there is evidence that they hunted on the surrounding button grass plains. Numerous small quarries and campgrounds are located nearby, with the closest dated site putting human occupation at 10,000 years ago.

The first European explorer to see the lake was surveyor William Sharland in 1832, with George Frankland leading an expedition to it three years later. In 1840 James Calder cut a track from the lake to Macquarie Harbour, followed by another more practical track by Burgess. The Burgess track was maintained and re-cut by miners until 1883 when a new lower level route was discovered, which later became the Lyell Highway.

The area surrounding the lake was used by snarers and hunters from 1860 until the collapse of the fur trade in the 1950s, although it was illegal from 1927 onwards.

In 1937 the Derwent River was dammed just below the lake, and a pumping station installed - enabling Hydro Tasmania to drain the lake up to 6 metres and feed water to the Tarraleah Power Station. The fluctuating water levels have caused erosion and environmental degradation since.  The pumphouse was decommissioned in the 1990s, and transformed into a hotel in 2015.

The Cradle Mountain-Lake St Clair area was declared a scenic reserve in 1922, a wildlife reserve in 1927, a national park in 1947 and a world heritage area from 1982.

Geography
The Cradle Mountain-Lake St Clair National Park occupies all of the locality, plus the locality of Cradle Mountain to the north.

Road infrastructure
The C193 route (Lake St Clair Road) enters from the south-east and runs to the southern shore of the lake, where it ends.

Tourism
In 1871, the Tasmanian Guidebook mentioned Lake St Clair as being "admired for its scenery by the few who visit". By 1900 there was a boatshed, accommodation, improved access and horse paddocks at Cynthia Bay, with the first tourists arriving by car in 1915.

From 1911 the beginnings of the Overland Track to Cradle Mountain began to form, with the route officially blazed by Bert Nichols in 1931.

A guesthouse was built at Cynthia Bay in 1930, followed by improved parking, camping and visitor facilities. The lake has been a popular tourist destination, with most tourists visiting to walk, photograph and learn about the history.

Following a decision by the Tasmanian Government to allow development in national parks and conservation areas an "in principle" permit was granted for the establishment of an "eco-friendly" resort at Pumphouse Point at Lake St Clair;
completed in 2015.

Gallery

See also

Overland Track

References

External links

Lake St Clair Fishing Information & Map

St Clair
Central Highlands (Tasmania)
Cradle Mountain-Lake St Clair National Park
Localities of Central Highlands Council
Localities of Meander Valley Council
Localities of West Coast Council
Towns in Tasmania